Graduate Medical Education (GME) refers to any type of formal medical education, usually hospital-sponsored or hospital-based training, pursued after receipt of the M.D. or D.O. degree in the United States This education includes internship, residency, subspecialty and fellowship programs, and leads to state licensure and board certification.

References

Medical education in the United States